Vladimir Parvatkin (born 10 October 1984) is a Russian racewalker. He competed in the men's 20 kilometres walk at the 2004 Summer Olympics.

References

1984 births
Living people
Place of birth missing (living people)
Russian male racewalkers
Olympic male racewalkers
Olympic athletes of Russia
Athletes (track and field) at the 2004 Summer Olympics
Russian Athletics Championships winners